TimesJobs.com is an Indian employment website operating in India and Middle East. It is owned and operated by The Times Group. It is one of three major job portals in India along with Naukri.com and Monster.com.

References

External links
 

The Times Group
Indian companies established in 2004
Business services companies established in 2004
Internet properties established in 2004
Employment websites in India
Companies based in Noida
2004 establishments in Uttar Pradesh